In mathematical finance, the Greeks are the quantities representing the sensitivity of the price of derivatives such as options to a change in underlying parameters on which the value of an instrument or portfolio of financial instruments is dependent. The name is used because the most common of these sensitivities are denoted by Greek letters (as are some other finance measures). Collectively these have also been called the risk sensitivities, risk measures or hedge parameters.

Use of the Greeks

The Greeks are vital tools in risk management. Each Greek measures the sensitivity of the value of a portfolio to a small change in a given underlying parameter, so that component risks may be treated in isolation, and the portfolio rebalanced accordingly to achieve a desired exposure; see for example delta hedging.

The Greeks in the Black–Scholes model are relatively easy to calculate, a desirable property of financial models, and are very useful for derivatives traders, especially those who seek to hedge their portfolios from adverse changes in market conditions. For this reason, those Greeks which are particularly useful for hedging—such as delta, theta, and vega—are well-defined for measuring changes in Price, Time and Volatility. Although rho is a primary input into the Black–Scholes model, the overall impact on the value of an option corresponding to changes in the risk-free interest rate is generally insignificant and therefore higher-order derivatives involving the risk-free interest rate are not common.

The most common of the Greeks are the first order derivatives: delta, vega, theta and rho as well as gamma, a second-order derivative of the value function. The remaining sensitivities in this list are common enough that they have common names, but this list is by no means exhaustive.

Names
The use of Greek letter names is presumably by extension from the common finance terms alpha and beta, and the use of sigma (the standard deviation of logarithmic returns) and tau (time to expiry) in the Black–Scholes option pricing model. Several names such as 'vega' and 'zomma' are invented, but sound similar to Greek letters. The names 'color' and 'charm' presumably derive from the use of these terms for exotic properties of quarks in particle physics.

First-order Greeks

Delta
Delta, measures the rate of change of the theoretical option value with respect to changes in the underlying asset's price. Delta is the first derivative of the value  of the option with respect to the underlying instrument's price .

Practical use
For a vanilla option, delta will be a number between 0.0 and 1.0 for a long call (or a short put) and 0.0 and −1.0 for a long put (or a short call); depending on price, a call option behaves as if one owns 1 share of the underlying stock (if deep in the money), or owns nothing (if far out of the money), or something in between, and conversely for a put option. The difference between the delta of a call and the delta of a put at the same strike is  equal to one. By put–call parity, long a call and short a put is equivalent to a forward F, which is linear in the spot S, with unit factor, so the derivative dF/dS is 1. See the formulas below.

These numbers are commonly presented as a percentage of the total number of shares represented by the option contract(s). This is convenient because the option will (instantaneously) behave like the number of shares indicated by the delta. For example, if a portfolio of 100 American call options on XYZ each have a delta of 0.25 (=25%), it will gain or lose value just like 2,500 shares of XYZ as the price changes for small price movements (100 option contracts covers 10,000 shares). The sign and percentage are often dropped – the sign is implicit in the option type (negative for put, positive for call) and the percentage is understood. The most commonly quoted are 25 delta put, 50 delta put/50 delta call, and 25 delta call. 50 Delta put and 50 Delta call are not quite identical, due to spot and forward differing by the discount factor, but they are often conflated.

Delta is always positive for long calls and negative for long puts (unless they are zero). The total delta of a complex portfolio of positions on the same underlying asset can be calculated by simply taking the sum of the deltas for each individual position – delta of a portfolio is linear in the constituents. Since the delta of underlying asset is always 1.0, the trader could delta-hedge his entire position in the underlying by buying or shorting the number of shares indicated by the total delta. For example, if the delta of a portfolio of options in XYZ (expressed as shares of the underlying) is +2.75, the trader would be able to delta-hedge the portfolio by selling short 2.75 shares of the underlying. This portfolio will then retain its total value regardless of which direction the price of XYZ moves. (Albeit for only small movements of the underlying, a short amount of time and not-withstanding changes in other market conditions such as volatility and the rate of return for a risk-free investment).

As a proxy for probability

The (absolute value of) Delta is close to, but not identical with, the percent moneyness of an option, i.e., the implied probability that the option will expire in-the-money (if the market moves under Brownian motion in the risk-neutral measure). For this reason some option traders use the absolute value of delta as an approximation for percent moneyness. For example, if an out-of-the-money call option has a delta of 0.15, the trader might estimate that the option has approximately a 15% chance of expiring in-the-money. Similarly, if a put contract has a delta of −0.25, the trader might expect the option to have a 25% probability of expiring in-the-money. At-the-money calls and puts have a delta of approximately 0.5 and −0.5 respectively with a slight bias towards higher deltas for ATM calls. The actual probability of an option finishing in the money is its dual delta, which is the first derivative of option price with respect to strike.

Relationship between call and put delta
Given a European call and put option for the same underlying, strike price and time to maturity, and with no dividend yield, the sum of the absolute values of the delta of each option will be 1 – more precisely, the delta of the call (positive) minus the delta of the put (negative) equals 1. This is due to put–call parity: a long call plus a short put (a call minus a put) replicates a forward, which has delta equal to 1.

If the value of delta for an option is known, one can calculate the value of the delta of the option of the same strike price, underlying and maturity but opposite right by subtracting 1 from a known call delta or adding 1 to a known put delta.

For example, if the delta of a call is 0.42 then one can compute the delta of the corresponding put at the same strike price by 0.42 − 1 = −0.58. To derive the delta of a call from a put, one can similarly take −0.58 and add 1 to get 0.42.

Vega
Vega measures sensitivity to volatility. Vega is the derivative of the option value with respect to the volatility of the underlying asset.

Vega is not the name of any Greek letter. Presumably the name vega was adopted because the Greek letter nu looked like a Latin vee, and vega was derived from vee by analogy with how beta, eta, and theta are pronounced in American English.

The symbol kappa, is sometimes used (by academics) instead of vega (as is tau
or capital lambda,

though these are rare).

Vega is typically expressed as the amount of money per underlying share that the option's value will gain or lose as volatility rises or falls by 1 percentage point. All options (both calls and puts) will gain value with rising volatility.

Vega can be an important Greek to monitor for an option trader, especially in volatile markets, since the value of some option strategies can be particularly sensitive to changes in volatility. The value of an at-the-money option straddle, for example, is extremely dependent on changes to volatility.

Theta
Theta, measures the sensitivity of the value of the derivative to the passage of time (see Option time value): the "time decay."

The mathematical result of the formula for theta (see below) is expressed in value per year. By convention, it is usual to divide the result by the number of days in a year, to arrive at the amount an option's price will drop, in relation to the underlying stock's price. Theta is almost always negative for long calls and puts, and positive for short (or written) calls and puts. An exception is a deep in-the-money European put. The total theta for a portfolio of options can be determined by summing the thetas for each individual position.

The value of an option can be analysed into two parts: the intrinsic value and the time value. The intrinsic value is the amount of money you would gain if you exercised the option immediately, so a call with strike $50 on a stock with price $60 would have intrinsic value of $10, whereas the corresponding put would have zero intrinsic value. The time value is the value of having the option of waiting longer before deciding to exercise. Even a deeply out of the money put will be worth something, as there is some chance the stock price will fall below the strike before the expiry date. However, as time approaches maturity, there is less chance of this happening, so the time value of an option is decreasing with time. Thus if you are long an option you are short theta: your portfolio will lose value with the passage of time (all other factors held constant).

Rho

Rho, measures sensitivity to the interest rate: it is the derivative of the option value with respect to the risk-free interest rate (for the relevant outstanding term).

Except under extreme circumstances, the value of an option is less sensitive to changes in the risk-free interest rate than to changes in other parameters. For this reason, rho is the least used of the first-order Greeks.

Rho is typically expressed as the amount of money, per share of the underlying, that the value of the option will gain or lose as the risk-free interest rate rises or falls by 1.0% per annum (100 basis points).

Lambda
Lambda, omega, or elasticity is the percentage change in option value per percentage change in the underlying price, a measure of leverage, sometimes called gearing.

It holds that .

Epsilon

Epsilon,  (also known as psi), is the percentage change in option value per percentage change in the underlying dividend yield, a measure of the dividend risk. The dividend yield impact is in practice determined using a 10% increase in those yields. Obviously, this sensitivity can only be applied to derivative instruments of equity products.

Second-order Greeks

Gamma
Gamma, measures the rate of change in the delta with respect to changes in the underlying price. Gamma is the second derivative of the value function with respect to the underlying price. 

Most long options have positive gamma and most short options have negative gamma. Long options have a positive relationship with gamma because as price increases, Gamma increases as well, causing Delta to approach 1 from 0 (long call option) and 0 from −1 (long put option). The inverse is true for short options. Gamma is greatest approximately at-the-money (ATM) and diminishes the further out you go either in-the-money (ITM) or out-of-the-money (OTM). Gamma is important because it corrects for the convexity of value.

When a trader seeks to establish an effective delta-hedge for a portfolio, the trader may also seek to neutralize the portfolio's gamma, as this will ensure that the hedge will be effective over a wider range of underlying price movements.

Vanna
Vanna, also referred to as DvegaDspot and DdeltaDvol, is a second order derivative of the option value, once to the underlying spot price and once to volatility. It is mathematically equivalent to DdeltaDvol, the sensitivity of the option delta with respect to change in volatility; or alternatively, the partial of vega with respect to the underlying instrument's price. Vanna can be a useful sensitivity to monitor when maintaining a delta- or vega-hedged portfolio as vanna will help the trader to anticipate changes to the effectiveness of a delta-hedge as volatility changes or the effectiveness of a vega-hedge against change in the underlying spot price.

If the underlying value has continuous second partial derivatives, then ,

Charm
Charm or delta decay measures the instantaneous rate of change of delta over the passage of time. 

Charm has also been called DdeltaDtime. Charm can be an important Greek to measure/monitor when delta-hedging a position over a weekend. Charm is a second-order derivative of the option value, once to price and once to the passage of time. It is also then the derivative of theta with respect to the underlying's price.

The mathematical result of the formula for charm (see below) is expressed in delta/year. It is often useful to divide this by the number of days per year to arrive at the delta decay per day. This use is fairly accurate when the number of days remaining until option expiration is large. When an option nears expiration, charm itself may change quickly, rendering full day estimates of delta decay inaccurate.

Vomma
Vomma, volga, vega convexity, or DvegaDvol measures second order sensitivity to volatility. Vomma is the second derivative of the option value with respect to the volatility, or, stated another way, vomma measures the rate of change to vega as volatility changes. 

With positive vomma, a position will become long vega as implied volatility increases and short vega as it decreases, which can be scalped in a way analogous to long gamma. And an initially vega-neutral, long-vomma position can be constructed from ratios of options at different strikes. Vomma is positive for long options away from the money, and initially increases with distance from the money (but drops off as vega drops off). (Specifically, vomma is positive where the usual d1 and d2 terms are of the same sign, which is true when d1 < 0 or d2 > 0.)

Veta
Veta or DvegaDtime measures the rate of change in the vega with respect to the passage of time. Veta is the second derivative of the value function; once to volatility and once to time.

It is common practice to divide the mathematical result of veta by 100 times the number of days per year to reduce the value to the percentage change in vega per one day.

Vera
Vera (sometimes rhova) measures the rate of change in rho with respect to volatility. Vera is the second derivative of the value function; once to volatility and once to interest rate.

The word 'Vera' was coined by R. Naryshkin in early 2012 when this sensitivity needed to be used in practice to assess the impact of volatility changes on rho-hedging, but no name yet existed in the available literature. 'Vera' was picked to sound similar to a combination of Vega and Rho, its respective first-order Greeks. This name is now in a wider use, including, for example, the Maple computer algebra software (which has 'BlackScholesVera' function in its Finance package).

Second order partial derivative with respect to strike K

This partial derivative has a fundamental role in the Breeden-Litzenberger formula, which uses quoted call option prices to estimate the risk-neutral probabilities implied by such prices.

For call options, it can be approximated using infinitesimal portfolios of butterfly strategies.

Third-order Greeks

Speed
Speed measures the rate of change in Gamma with respect to changes in the underlying price. 

This is also sometimes referred to as the gamma of the gamma or DgammaDspot. Speed is the third derivative of the value function with respect to the underlying spot price. Speed can be important to monitor when delta-hedging or gamma-hedging a portfolio.

Zomma
Zomma measures the rate of change of gamma with respect to changes in volatility. 

Zomma has also been referred to as DgammaDvol. Zomma is the third derivative of the option value, twice to underlying asset price and once to volatility. Zomma can be a useful sensitivity to monitor when maintaining a gamma-hedged portfolio as zomma will help the trader to anticipate changes to the effectiveness of the hedge as volatility changes.

Color
Color, gamma decay or DgammaDtime measures the rate of change of gamma over the passage of time. 

Color is a third-order derivative of the option value, twice to underlying asset price and once to time. Color can be an important sensitivity to monitor when maintaining a gamma-hedged portfolio as it can help the trader to anticipate the effectiveness of the hedge as time passes.

The mathematical result of the formula for color (see below) is expressed in gamma per year. It is often useful to divide this by the number of days per year to arrive at the change in gamma per day. This use is fairly accurate when the number of days remaining until option expiration is large. When an option nears expiration, color itself may change quickly, rendering full day estimates of gamma change inaccurate.

Ultima
Ultima measures the sensitivity of the option vomma with respect to change in volatility. 

Ultima has also been referred to as DvommaDvol. Ultima is a third-order derivative of the option value to volatility.

Greeks for multi-asset options
If the value of a derivative is dependent on two or more underlyings, its Greeks are extended to include the cross-effects between the underlyings.

Correlation delta measures the sensitivity of the derivative's value to a change in the correlation between the underlyings. It is also commonly known as cega.

Cross gamma measures the rate of change of delta in one underlying to a change in the level of another underlying.

Cross vanna measures the rate of change of vega in one underlying due to a change in the level of another underlying. Equivalently, it measures the rate of change of delta in the second underlying due to a change in the volatility of the first underlying.

Cross volga measures the rate of change of vega in one underlying to a change in the volatility of another underlying.

Formulas for European option Greeks

Note that the gamma and vega formulas are the same for calls and puts.

For a given:
 Stock price ,
 Strike price ,
 Risk-free rate ,
 Annual dividend yield ,
 Time to maturity  (represented as a unit-less fraction of one year), and
 Volatility .

where

Under the Black model (commonly used for commodities and options on futures) the Greeks can be calculated as follows:

where

(*) It can be shown that 

Micro proof:
let 

Then we have:

So

Related measures
Some related risk measures of financial instruments are listed below.

Bond duration and convexity

In trading bonds and other fixed income securities, various measures of bond duration are used analogously to the delta of an option. The closest analogue to the delta is DV01, which is the reduction in price (in currency units) for an increase of one basis point (i.e. 0.01% per annum) in the yield (the yield is the underlying variable).
See also .

Analogous to the lambda is the modified duration, which is the percentage change in the market price of the bond(s) for a unit change in the yield (i.e. it is equivalent to DV01 divided by the market price). Unlike the lambda, which is an elasticity (a percentage change in output for a percentage change in input), the modified duration is instead a semi-elasticity—a percentage change in output for a unit change in input.
See also Key rate duration.

Bond convexity is a measure of the sensitivity of the duration to changes in interest rates, the second derivative of the price of the bond with respect to interest rates (duration is the first derivative); it is then analogous to gamma. In general, the higher the convexity, the more sensitive the bond price is to the change in interest rates. Bond convexity is one of the most basic and widely used forms of convexity in finance.

For a bond with an embedded option, the standard yield to maturity based calculations here do not consider how changes in interest rates will alter the cash flows due to option exercise. To address this, effective duration and effective convexity are introduced. These values are typically calculated using a tree-based model, built for the entire yield curve (as opposed to a single yield to maturity), and therefore capturing exercise behavior at each point in the option's life as a function of both time and interest rates; see .

Beta

The beta (β) of a stock or portfolio is a number describing the volatility of an asset in relation to the volatility of the benchmark that said asset is being compared to. This benchmark is generally the overall financial market and is often estimated via the use of representative indices, such as the S&P 500.

An asset has a Beta of zero if its returns change independently of changes in the market's returns. A positive beta means that the asset's returns generally follow the market's returns, in the sense that they both tend to be above their respective averages together, or both tend to be below their respective averages together. A negative beta means that the asset's returns generally move opposite the market's returns: one will tend to be above its average when the other is below its average.

Fugit

The fugit is the expected time to exercise an American or Bermudan option. Fugit is usefully computed for hedging purposes — for example, one can represent flows of an American swaption like the flows of a swap starting at the fugit multiplied by delta, and then use these to compute other sensitivities.

See also
 Alpha (finance)
 Beta (finance)
 Delta neutral
 Financial risk management
 Greek letters used in mathematics, science, and engineering
 
 Vanna–Volga pricing

References

External links
Theory
 Delta, Gamma, GammaP, Gamma symmetry, Vanna, Speed, Charm, Saddle Gamma: Vanilla Options - Espen Haug,
 Volga, Vanna, Speed, Charm, Color: Vanilla Options - Uwe Wystup, Vanilla Options - Uwe Wystup

Step-by-step mathematical derivations of option Greeks
 Derivation of European Vanilla Call Price
 Derivation of European Vanilla Call Delta
 Derivation of European Vanilla Call Gamma
 Derivation of European Vanilla Call Speed
 Derivation of European Vanilla Call Vega
 Derivation of European Vanilla Call Volga
 Derivation of European Vanilla Call Vanna as Derivative of Vega with respect to underlying
 Derivation of European Vanilla Call Vanna as Derivative of Delta with respect to volatility
 Derivation of European Vanilla Call Theta
 Derivation of European Vanilla Call Rho
 Derivation of European Vanilla Put Price
 Derivation of European Vanilla Put Delta
 Derivation of European Vanilla Put Gamma
 Derivation of European Vanilla Put Speed
 Derivation of European Vanilla Put Vega
 Derivation of European Vanilla Put Volga
 Derivation of European Vanilla Put Vanna as Derivative of Vega with respect to underlying
 Derivation of European Vanilla Put Vanna as Derivative of Delta with respect to volatility
 Derivation of European Vanilla Put Theta
 Derivation of European Vanilla Put Rho

Online tools
 Surface Plots of Black-Scholes Greeks, Chris Murray
 Online real-time option prices and Greeks calculator when the underlying is normally distributed, Razvan Pascalau, Univ. of Alabama
 greeks: Sensitivities of Prices of Financial Options, R package to compute Greeks for European-, American- and Asian Options 

Mathematical finance
Financial ratios
Options (finance)